John Sisko (May 22, 1958 – May 19, 2016) was an American realist sculptor who lived and worked in Seattle in Washington State.

Life 

John Sisko spent his early years in Montana. At age 6, he was first exposed to great sculpture at the 1964 New York World's Fair where Michelangelo's Pietà was exhibited outside of Italy for the first time. Sisko moved to suburban Seattle at age 13, where he resided through high school. At the age of 20, he began study in the Fine Arts at Western Washington University where he met Tom Sherwood. Beginning in 1979, Sisko studied studio practices under Sherwood for the next eight years. During this time, Sisko also attended the University of Washington, graduating with a B.A. in philosophy in 1987.

John Sisko was a Fellow of the National Sculpture Society and served on the editorial board of Sculpture Review magazine. John Sisko has taught at Seattle University, Gage Academy in Seattle, and Brookgreen Gardens in South Carolina.

Work 

John Sisko was a contemporary American realist sculptor. He has made over 110 limited-edition bronzes, 16 commissioned projects, and has participated in over 45 exhibitions across the United States. His sculpture is characterized by a distinctive plainer or facetted modeling of the forms and intentionally distorting proportion characteristics (particularly hands and feet). In making his sculpture, Sisko works with themes of intellectual, spiritual, and philosophical depth.

Public collections 
 Archbishop Murphy High School, Seattle, Washington
 Bellevue Athletic Club, Bellevue, Washington
 Brookgreen Gardens, Pawleys Island, South Carolina
 Genzyme Corporation, Boston, Massachusetts
 Hedges Cellars, Issaquah, Washington
 Island County Courthouse, Coupeville, Washington
 KMS Inc., Seattle, Washington
 King County Library System, Issaquah, Washington
 Seattle University, Seattle, Washington
 Trillium Corporation, Bellingham, Washington
 University of Washington Medical Center (Hospital), Seattle, Washington
 Woodland Park Zoo, Zoomazium, Seattle Washington

Citations 
 Fine Art Connoisseur. July/August 2009. Volume 6, Issue 4. Artists Making Their Mark
 Made Men: Sculptors who revisit the classic male form in stone and bronze. John O’Hern. American Art Collector Magazine.
 Hexagon. Sculpture Review, Second Quarter.
 It is Good. Documentary by James Hupf.
 A Look at the 2008 Coker Master Sculptors. Brookgreen Journal. June 2008.

References

External links 
 Sisko Galley

1958 births
20th-century American sculptors
Western Washington University alumni
2016 deaths
Artists from Montana
21st-century American sculptors